Desh or Des is a Hindustani classical music raga which belongs to the Khamaj thaat. This raga is very similar to raga Khamaj.

Technical description 
The raga is of audava-sampurna nature, i.e., in its arohana (ascent) only five notes are used, whereas the avarohana (descent) uses all the seven notes.
Shuddha Ni is used in the arohana, while Komal Ni (represented as ni below) is used in avarohana. All other swaras are shuddha.
 Arohana: Ni Sa Re, Ma Pa Ni, Sa.
 Avarohana: Sa ni Dha, Pa Dha Ma Ga Re, Pa Ma Ga, Re Ga Ni Sa.
Pakad: Re, Ma Pa Ni, Sa Re ni Dha Pa, ma Ga Re
 The vadi swara is Re

The ascent in this raga is a step by step pentatonic movement which goes like this: Sa, Re, Ma Pa, Ni Sa’.

Samayam (Time): The raga is to be sung during the second quarter of the night (9PM to 12AM).

Re is very prominent, quite a few times the singer rests on Re, making it a centre to the melody. The Meend from Ma to Re via Ga is one of the most vital features of the raga. The arohana via shuddha Ni, and the transition from Re to komal Ni in the avarohana form an important part of the melodies in this raga. Further, Desh is quite close to neighboring ragas like Tilak Kamod, and hence requires skillful rendition to separate itself.

Prominent Songs
Desh has been used in a few patriotic compositions. Vande Mataram, the national song of India, is the most well-known. The popular old Doordarshan video Baje Sargam, that featured many respected Indian classical singers, is also based on Desh.

Rabindrasangeet based on the raga 

The polymath and Nobel laureate, Rabindranath Tagore, had very often used Hindustani Classical Music and Carnatic Classical Music in his songs (Rabindrasangeet). The songs based on this raga Des are listed below:

 Aachhe Tomar Bidye Sadhhi
 Aaj Taaler Boner Karotaali
 Aaji Mor Dware Kahar
 Aamader Sokhire Ke Niye
 Aamar E Ghore Aaponar
 Aamar Je Sob Dite Hobe
 Aamar Satya Mithya Sakoli
 Aami Jene Shune Bish
 Aar Rekho Na Aandhare
 Anek Diner Aamar Je Gaan
 Anek Kotha Bolechilem
 Animesh Aankhi Sei Ke De
 Dekhaye De Kotha Aachhe
 Dhoroni Dure Cheye Keno
 Dnaarao Maatha Khaao
 Duare Dao More Rakhia
 E Bharote Raakho Nityo
 Ebaar Bujhi Bholar Bela
 Ebaar To Jouboner Kachhe
 Ebaar Ujaar Kore Lowo He
 Ei Lobhinu Songo Tabo
 Ei Shrabon Bela Badol Jhora
 Emon Dine Taare Bola Jaay
 Eso Aamar Ghore
 Eso Shyamalosundaro
Gagoner Thale Robi Chandra
 Gahonraate Shrabondhara
 Garob Mamo Horechho Prob
 Haay Ke Dibe Aar Santona
 Hey Bidesi Eso Eso
 Jaag Jaag Re Jaag Sangeet
 Je Din Sakol Mukul
 Jeyo Na Jeyo Na Phire
 Jhore Jaay Ure Jaay Go
 Jodi Holo Jaabar Kshon
 Keno Raaja Daakis Keno
 Knaadale Tumi More
 Knaapiche Deholota
 Kotha Hote Baaje Prembedona
 Kothaay Aalo Kothaay Ore
 Kshomite Parilam Na Je
 Naa Naa Kaaj Nai Jeyo Naa
 Ogo Sundar Ekada Ki Jaani
 Probhu Khelechhi Aanek
 Puruser Bidya Korechinu
 Se Aase Dhire
 Shrabano Borisano Paar
 Shrabonmegher Aadhek
 Sokhi Lo Sokhi Lo
 Taai Tomar Ananda Aamar
 Taare Dekhate Paari Ne
 Tomari Tore Maa Sopinu
 Toper Taper Baadhon Katu
 Tumi Chhere Chhile Bhule
 Utol Dhara Badol Jhore

Carnatic Compositions 
Vikasita Pankaja by Kalyani Varadarajan
Vithala Salaho Swami by Purandara Dasa

Film Songs

Language: Tamil

References

External links
 Raaga details from Sounds of India
 Film songs in Desh
 About Desh on Chandrakantha

Hindustani ragas